Coleman may refer to:

Places

Antarctica
 Coleman Glacier (Antarctica)
 Coleman Peak, Ross Island

Canada
 Coleman, Alberta
 Coleman, Ontario
 Coleman, Prince Edward Island

United Kingdom
 Coleman, Leicester, England

United States
 Coleman, Arkansas
 Coleman, California
 Coleman, Georgia
 Coleman, Florida
 Coleman, Michigan
 Coleman, Missouri
 Coleman, Ohio
 Coleman, Oklahoma
 Coleman, Texas
 Coleman, West Virginia
 Coleman, Wisconsin
 Coleman Branch, a stream in Tennessee
 Coleman City, California
 Coleman County, Texas
 Coleman Glacier (Washington)
 Coleman Township, Holt County, Nebraska

Other uses
 Coleman (surname)
 Jamye Coleman Williams (1918–2022), American activist and writer
 Coleman Company, a manufacturer of camping gear
 Coleman Manufacturing Company a North Carolina textile mill
 Coleman Medal, an Australian Football League award

See also
 Colman (disambiguation)